Admiral Doyle may refer to:

Austin K. Doyle (1898–1970), U.S. Navy admiral
James H. Doyle (1897–1982), U.S. Navy vice admiral and namesake of the USS Doyle (FFG-39)
James H. Doyle Jr. (1925–2018), U.S. Navy vice admiral
Peter Hogarth Doyle (1925–2007), Royal Australian Navy rear admiral
Robert Morris Doyle (1853–1925), U.S. Navy rear admiral
USS Doyle (FFG-39), frigate launched in 1982, named after James Henry Doyle

See also
Warren D'Oyly (1867–1950), British Royal Navy vice admiral